Akhtar Raza Saleemi is a Pakistani Urdu, Hindko, and Potohari poet, novelist, writer, critic and editor. His birth name is Muhammad Pervaiz Akhtar.
 He is a recognized poet of both ghazal and nazm. He has published several poetry books and has been appreciated for his work by critics. He stayed in the genre of poetry till 2008 and then started experimenting with the style of novel writing. His fictional work often combines Magic realism and Historical fiction with a special focus on his life in his hometown. The topics of death and dreams are predominant in his novels.

His first novel, Jaagein Hain Khawab Mein (Urdu: جاگے ہیں خواب میں) had 1001 paintings by Wasi Haider as its cover page.

His second novel Jandar (Urdu: جندر), published in 2017, received the UBL Literary Award for Fiction (2019). The novel has been translated into Brahui and Pashto.

Biography 

Akhtar Raza Saleemi was born on 16 June 1974, at Kekot, a village of the district Haripur, Khyber Pakhtunkhwa, Pakistan.He is the son of Sardar Sher Zaman, a part-time businessman

He received his early education from his native village. When he was in fifth grade due to the strict behavior and the subsequent punishment of the teacher, he left his education. Afterwards was sent to Karachi, where his elder brother, Sardar Muhammad Saleem lived and owned a hotel. He resumed his education and in 1991 received his matriculation certificate with 2nd position.

Then he moved again to Rawalpindi, from where he cleared his FA examination in 1995.

Then he moved to Islamabad and is now settled there. He graduated from Allama Iqbal Open University in the Fall 2003. He also did his Masters in Urdu from University of Sargodha in 2011.

Personal life 
He is married to his distant relative's daughter on 24 April 2004. They have two sons - Ayaan Raza Saleemi and Hannan Raza Saleemi - and one daughter, Midhat Raza Saleemi. They live in Islamabad.

Literary career 
Saleemi started his literary career in 1991 with a story written for children edition of Daily Jang. In this span he wrote some stories, critical and non-critical essays, however, at the behest of Ahmad Hussain Mujahid, he started doing poetry in the genre of ghazal. He has published two books on Urdu ghazals namely: Ikhtara (Urdu: اختراع) (2003), Iratafa (Urdu: ارتفاع) (2008) and one full collection of ghazals Khushbu Mere Sath Chal Pari Hai (Urdu: خوشبو مرے ساتھ چل پڑی ہے ) (2009). Critics have appreciated Saleemi's poetry in the following words:
"Saleemi has chosen a difficult genre of the ghazal. It goes without saying that it is very hard to compose effective couplets. He prefers thought to the word". Another critic wrote, "Saleemi portrays a unique blend of reality and dreams expressed with exacerbated sensibility, fine sharpness of his perception, clarity, and splendour of his language." To fully express himself, Saleemi found Ghazal insufficiant, therefore, he forsook it in 2008 and started experimenting with another and more relaxed form of poetry, nazm. He has published a collection of his nazms as Khaab Dan (Urdu: خواب دان) (2013).

Afterwards, he started writing novels too, which he says is his favorite genre because it has no restrictions. He has two novels to his name so far: Jaagein Hain Khaab Mein (Urdu: جاگے ہیں خواب میں ) (2015) and Jandar (Urdu: جندر) (2017). On writing novels, Saleemi says: In all of my works, I like novel-writing the most. When I write novels, it gives me a different kind of intoxication which I have never felt when I am writing something else. This intoxication is very gloomy.

Professional career 
Meanwhile, he joined the Pakistan Academy of Letters (Islamabad) in 2006 and has been working as an Urdu editor since 2013 of Quarterly Magazine Adbiyat and Adbiyat-e-Itfal, also being the pioneer of the latter. In addition to this, he acts as a coordinating editor of six magazines issued by the Pakistan Academy of Letters: Adbiyat-e-Sindh (Sindhi), Adbiyat-e-Balochistan (Baloch), Adbiyat-e-KhyberPakhtunkhwa (Pashto, Hindko), Adbiyat-e-Punjab (Punjabi, Siraiki, Potohari) and Pakistani Literature (English).

Critical Appreciation 
On his first novel (Jaagein Hain Khaab Mein) Mustansar Hussain Tarar says: "This novel is a wonderous jump vis-a-vis novel-writing ... It is the dream of Urdu novel-writing that we have seeing for some time now, and now, when it is materialized, we should stand up and welcome it."

On his second novel (Jandar), Iftikhar Arif says: Every masterpiece intoxicate its readers and this novel has done just that. Muhammad Hameed Shahid says: "Jandar is very favorite novel; it is one of its kind. In this novel, life is revealed in all its vieled meanings."

In addition to the critics reviews, there are many Master's and PhD thesis done on Saleemi's works.

Awards

 Quaid e Aazam literary gold medal for 2009
 Professor Muhammad Shafi Sabir Award (2015) for prose by Abasin Arts Council. 
 Allah Bakhsh Yousfi Award (2018) for Prose by Abasin Arts Council. 
 UBL Literary Award for Fiction (2019).

Bibliography

 Ikhtara  2003 اختراع
 Irtafa 2008 ارتفاع
 Khushbu marey saath chal pari hay…2009خوشبو مِرے ساتھ چل پڑی ہے)
 Khaawab Daan 2013 (خواب دان) ( Urdu poetry)
 Har paasey parchaanwaan maahra(ہر پاسے پرچھاواں مھاڑا) ( Potohaari poetry)
 Jaage Hain Khawab Mein(جاگے ہیں خواب میں) 2015
 Jandar (جندر) 2017

Edited Works 
Following are Saleemi's edited works:

 2011 ki Behtareen Shayari (2012) Pakistan Academy of Letters 
 Ek Mulk Ek Kahani (2015) National Book Foundation
 ECO Ke Rukn Mumalik ki Muntakhib Kahaniyan (2017) Takhleeqat
 Ao Bacho! Suno Kahani Vol. 1 & 2 (2020) National Book Foundation

See also
 List of Pakistani poets
 List of Urdu language poets
 List of Pakistani writers
 List of Urdu language writers

References

External links
 Quality literary treat! (part 1)

1974 births
Living people
People from Haripur District
20th-century Pakistani poets
Urdu-language poets from Pakistan
People from Khyber Pakhtunkhwa
Pakistani novelists
Urdu-language novelists